A state's foreign policy or external policy (as opposed to internal or domestic policy) is its objectives and activities in relation to its interactions with other states, unions, and other political entities, whether bilaterally or through multilateral platforms. The Encyclopedia Britannica notes that a government's foreign policy may be influenced by "domestic considerations, the policies or behaviour of other states, or plans to advance specific geopolitical designs."

History 

The idea of long-term management of relationships followed the development of professional diplomatic corps that managed diplomacy.

In the 18th century, due to extreme turbulence in European diplomacy and ongoing conflicts, the practice of diplomacy was often fragmented by the necessity to deal with isolated issues, termed "affairs". Therefore, while domestic management of such issues was termed civil affairs (peasant riots, treasury shortfalls, and court intrigues), the term foreign affairs was applied to the management of temporary issues outside the sovereign realm. This term remained in widespread use in the English-speaking states into the 20th century, and remains the name of departments in several states that manage foreign relations. Although originally intended to describe short term management of a specific concern, these departments now manage all day-to-day and long-term international relations among states.

Think tanks are occasionally employed by government foreign relations organisations to provide research and advocacy in the development of foreign policy proposals, alternatives to existing policy, or to provide analytical assessments of evolving relationships.

Objectives 
There are several objectives that may motivate a government's foreign policy. Among other reasons, foreign policy may be directed for defense and security, for economic benefit, or to provide assistance to states that need it. All foreign policy objectives are interconnected and contribute to a single, comprehensive foreign policy for each state. Unlike domestic policy, foreign policy issues tend to arise suddenly in response to developments and major events in foreign countries.

Defense 
Foreign policy is often directed for the purpose of ensuring national security. Governments forming military alliances with foreign states in order to deter and show stronger resistance to attack. Foreign policy also focuses on combating adversarial states through soft power, international isolation, or war.

In the 21st century, defensive foreign policy has expanded to address the threat of global terrorism.

Economic 
Foreign policy is central for a country's role within the world economy and international trade. Economic foreign policy issues may include the establishment of trade agreements, the distribution of foreign aid, and the management of imports and exports.

Internationalist 
Many states have developed humanitarian programs under the concept of the responsibility to protect. Proponents of liberal internationalism believe that it is the duty of stronger and more well-off countries to assist and support less powerful countries. This idea is often associated with the idealist school of thought. Liberal internationalist support can take the form of defensive or economic support.

Influences

Size 
Superpowers are able to project power and exercise their influence across the world, while great powers and middle powers have moderate influence in global affairs.

Small powers have less ability to exercise influence unilaterally, as they have fewer economic and military resources to leverage. As a result, they are more likely to support international and multilateral organizations. The diplomatic bureaucracies of smaller states are also smaller, which limits their capacity to engage in complex diplomacy. Smaller states may seek to ally themselves with larger countries for economic and defensive benefits, or they may avoid involvement in international disputes so as to remain on friendly terms with all countries.

Form of government 
The political institutions and forms of government play a role in a country's foreign policy. In a democracy, public opinion and the methods of political representation both affect a country's foreign policy. Democratic countries are also believed to be less likely to resort to military conflict with one another. Autocratic states are less likely to use legalism in their foreign policies. Under a dictatorship, a state's foreign policy may depend heavily on the preferences of the dictator. Dictators that interfere significantly with their foreign policy apparatus may be less predictable and more likely to make foreign policy blunders.

Study 

The study of foreign policy considers why and how states interact with one another and maintain relations. Several schools of thought exist in the study of foreign policy, including the rational actor model based on rational choice theory, the government bargaining model that posits the foreign policy apparatus as several competing interests, and the organizational process model that posits the foreign policy apparatus as interlinked bureaucracies that each play their own role.

Think tanks exist that study foreign policy specifically, including the Council on Foreign Relations in the United States and the Chatham House in the United Kingdom.

See also
 Alliance
 Balance of power (international relations)
 Diplomacy
 Intergovernmental organization
 International relations theory
 International relations

References

Further reading
 Christopher Hill, The Changing Politics of Foreign Policy, Basingstoke: Palgrave Macmillan, 2003.
 Jean-Frédéric Morin and Jonathan Paquin, Foreign Policy Analysis: A Toolbox, Palgrave, 2018.
 Steve Smith, Amelia Hadley and Tim Dunne (eds), Foreign Policy: Theories, Actors, Cases, 1st ed., Oxford: Oxford University Press, 2008.
 Frank A. Stengel and Rainer Baumann, "Non-State Actors and Foreign Policy," The Oxford Encyclopedia of Foreign Policy Analysis, edited by Cameron Thies, 266–86. Oxford: Oxford University Press. doi: 10.1093/acrefore/9780190228637.013.456.

External links
 

Foreign policy
Subfields of political science
International relations
Public policy